Janek Meet (born 2 May 1974 in Viljandi) is a retired Estonian footballer, who played in the Meistriliiga, for FC Kuressaare, whom he joined from JK Viljandi Tulevik after the 2002 season. He played the position of defender.

International career
He made a total of 37 appearances for the Estonia national football team. He made his international debut in 1995.

References

External links

1974 births
Living people
Sportspeople from Viljandi
Estonian footballers
Estonia international footballers
Viljandi JK Tulevik players
FC Flora players
FC Kuressaare players
FC Norma Tallinn players
Association football defenders